Charles Salisbury Butler (1812 – 12 November 1870) was a British Liberal Party and Radical politician.

Family and early life
Born in 1812, Butler was the son of John and Elizabeth Mary (née Butt) Butler. He married Elizabeth, daughter of Edward Kingstone, in 1833 and they had eight children: Charles Edward Kingstone (died 1869); John Banks Meek; Elizabeth Lecesne Kingstone; Emily; Sophia; Frances; Rosa Seldon; and Louisa.

Political career
Butler was elected Radical MP for Tower Hamlets at the 1852 general election and, joining the Liberal Party upon its formation in 1859, he held the seat until 1868 when he stood down.

Other activities
Butler was also a Justice of the Peace for Middlesex, City of Westminster and the Liberties of the Tower of London as well as Deputy Lieutenant for the latter. He also held the role of Chairman of the Quarter Sessions of the Liberties of Her Majesty's Tower and of the Court of Lieutenancy of the Tower Hamlets, and Chairman of the Divisional Bench of the County of Middlesex. Upon the death of the Arthur Wellesley, 1st Duke of Wellington, he jointly and temporarily held the office of Lord Lieutenant of the Tower Hamlets with William FitzGerald-de Ros, 22nd Baron de Ros.

References

External links
 

Liberal Party (UK) MPs for English constituencies
UK MPs 1852–1857
UK MPs 1857–1859
UK MPs 1859–1865
UK MPs 1865–1868
1812 births
1870 deaths
Deputy Lieutenants of the Tower Hamlets
Lord-Lieutenants of the Tower Hamlets